Type 38 may refer to the following Japanese weapons:
Type 38 rifle
Type 38 cavalry rifle
Type 38 75 mm Field Gun
Type 38 10 cm Cannon
Type 38 15 cm howitzer